Diego Dionatas dos Santos or simply Diego  (born May 5, 1986, in Valparaíso), is a Brazilian goalkeeper, who is currently playing for the Brazilian team Desportivo Brasil.

References

Living people
1986 births
Brazilian footballers
Association football goalkeepers
Desportivo Brasil players